Wendell Smith is a Canadian actor born in Antigonish, Nova Scotia.

History 
Originally based in Nova Scotia, Wendell Smith co-founded the Mulgrave Road Theatre Co-op in Guysborough in 1977. Smith has worked more frequently as a stage actor, although he has also appeared in several Canadian feature films, especially television films.

In 1978, Smith played the role of Antonio in the Citadel Theatre's production of Shakespeare's Twelfth Night. In 1980, Smith played both the part of Dr. Patrick and the part of the defense lawyer in Sharon Pollack's play Blood Relations. In 1983, Smith began workshopping plays with Theatre Calgary in Calgary, Alberta. In 1985, Smith played the lead role in Lyle Victor Albert's play White on White.

In the late 1980s and throughout the 1990s, Wendell Smith became heavily involved in the theater scene in Edmonton, Alberta; by 1988 the Edmonton Journal had described Smith as one of the "mainstays of the local acting scene." Smith was frequently involved, both as an actor and director, with Edmonton International Fringe Festival, North America's oldest and largest fringe theatre festival; for example, in 1987 Smith directed the play Ba Ba Ha at the Edmonton Fringe and in 1997 he acted in Gordon Pengilly's play Seeds at the Edmonton Fringe. Wendell Smith also appeared in the Citadel Theatre's annual production of A Christmas Carol on multiple occasions; in 1987 he played Bob Cratchit and in 1993 he played Mr. Fezziwig.

In 1999, Wendell Smith played False Arkansas Tom in the TV-movie You Know My Name. Throughout the 1980s and 1990s, Smith was noted for the gravelly voice he employed as an actor.

Recognition 
In 1979, Keith Ashwell wrote that "Smith acts his part marvelously," and in 1985, journalist Liz Nicholls described Smith as "indisputably a gifted comedian."

In 1996, Smith won the Elizabeth Sterling Haynes Award in the category of Best Supporting Actor for his work in Jim Guedo's play Simpatico.

Personal life 
Wendell Smith is the older brother of Canadian actor Stephen McHattie.

Filmography

References

External links 

 
Allmovie page

Canadian male film actors
Canadian male television actors
Canadian male voice actors
Living people
Male actors from Nova Scotia
People from Antigonish, Nova Scotia
Year of birth missing (living people)